A by-election for the seat of Tweed in the New South Wales Legislative Assembly was held on 6 December 1894 because the Elections and Qualifications Committee declared that the election of John Willard was void as he did not meet the residency qualification, having spent much of that 12 months in Queensland.

Dates

Results

The Elections and Qualifications Committee declared that the election of John Willard was void as he did not meet the residency qualification, having spent much of that 12 months in Queensland.

See also
Electoral results for the district of Tweed
List of New South Wales state by-elections

Notes

References

1894 elections in Australia
New South Wales state by-elections
1890s in New South Wales